Okugome (奥米, Okugome) is a mountainous area located in Kimitsu, Chiba, Japan.

The town is situated in the middle of the mountains of the Bōsō Peninsula. There are no major towns or villages in Okugome, just isolated farms. The area would have been very isolated before the Okugome tunnel and other bridges were constructed.

Geography 
The Okugome area is mostly forest with a few small farms and is located on the south-central Bōsō Peninsula.

Surrounding Municipalities 
 Tōgane, Chiba
 Sanbu, Chiba
 Ōamishirasato, Chiba

History 
Okugome was established in 1952 when the Okugome tunnel was built in order to access the area. It was previously only accessible via a mountain path. The Okugome tunnel is often suggested as haunted due to its curved construction. Japanese legend suggests tunnels where you cannot see either end from the middle contain spirits, as they cannot escape.

Economy 
The only industry in the town is light farming on the small rice paddies.

Transportation

Highway
Okugome is accessed from the Boso Skyline in  the north.

Local attractions 
Okugome Tunnel
Mishima Dam (Mishima Lake)
Okugome Sudajī tree
Nagaura & Shimizu Suspension Bridges (married couple bridges)

Gallery

References

External links 
  Okugome tunnel
 http://ameblo.jp/papagenopapagena/entry-12136096956.html
 https://blogs.yahoo.co.jp/nobuhiro_suzu/39737425.html
 http://chibataki.poo.gs/takicard/koitogawa/sangengawa/kaikonbaf.htm
http://bunkabito.jp/magazine/article_tsuribashi/vol_0007/index.html
http://kintsuri.main.jp/A193_nagaura.html
http://kintsuri.main.jp/A194_shimizu.html

Towns in Chiba Prefecture
Rice production
Populated places established in 1952
1952 establishments in Japan